Patna Police (Hindi: पटना पुलिस) is the police service responsible for law enforcement within Patna district, including the capital city of Patna in an Indian state of Bihar. Patna Police is the largest police service in the state. Its headquarters are at Gandhi Maidan Marg in Patna. The present SSP of Patna Police is manavjit singh Dhillon since January 1, 2020.

History
Patna is one of the oldest continuously inhabited places in the world, and policing in Patna is more than 3000 years old.

Today

Patna police is broadly divided into four regions namely Central, East, West and Rural, each headed by a Superintendent of Police. For administrative purposes, each region is subdivided into Neighbourhood Policing Teams, each led by an Inspector. The Neighbourhood Policing Team's are responsible for the bulk of the community work undertaken in an area, and look to deal with long term local issues including Anti-Social Behaviour.

The Traffic Police is a semi-autonomous body under the Patna Police.

Services provided by the Patna Police include:
 Preventing, detecting and investigating crime;
 Monitoring and promoting road safety;
 Maintaining social order;
 Performing and coordinating search and rescue operations; and
 Emergency management
 Stopping illegal constructions and frauds
 They have also started special investigation against liquors and old currency notes of 500 and 1000 INR after the ban.

Further policing duties performed are traffic control, intelligence analysis and anti-terrorism investigation. The overall mission of the Patna Police is to protect life and property and to detect and prevent crime.

Rank structure
The rank structure of Patna Police officers is as follows (in descending order of seniority):

Zonal level
 Inspector General of Police - Patna Zone (Sunil Kumar)
Range level
Deputy Inspector General of Police - Patna Range (Rajesh Kumar)
District level
Senior Superintendent of Police (Upendra Kumar Sharma)
(five) Superintendent of Police (SP)
City Central (Vinay Tiwari)
City East ( Jitender Kumar)
City West (Abhinav Kumar)
Rural (Kantesh Kuar Mishra)
Traffic (D Amrakesh)
Additional Superintendent of Police
Assistant Superintendent of Police
Circle level
(Fifteen) Deputy Superintendent of Police (DSP)
Station level
Inspector of Police/ Station House Officers
Sub-Inspector of Police 
Assistant Sub-Inspector of Police
Constabulary 
Head Constable
Senior Constable
Constable

Recently, a proposal for creating police commissioner system for the state capital has been sent to the state government by Bihar Police, the parent agency.

Equipment
All the equipment of the Patna Police are manufactured indigenously by the Indian Ordnance Factories controlled by the Ordnance Factories Board, Ministry of Defence, Government of India.
 Wooden Baton
 Revolver 0.32 
 Pistol Auto 9mm 1A
 9mm SAF Carbine 1A1
 7.62 mm Ishapore 2A1 Rifle
 RFI L1A1 Self-Loading Rifle
 AK 47/ AKM
 INSAS Rifle

Vehicles
 
 Mahindra Legend
 Chevrolet Tavera
 Mahindra Xylo
 Toyota Qualis
 Maruti Gypsy
 Royal Enfield Bullet
 Hero MotoCorp Glamour
 TVS Apache
 Mahindra Bolero
 Tata Sumo
Mahindra Thar
Mahindra Scorpio

References

External links
 Official website
 Official website of Traffic police
 Important Numbers for Patna District Police
 Bihar Police Telephone Numbers

Law enforcement agencies of India
Metropolitan law enforcement agencies of India
Government of Patna
1862 establishments in India
Bihar Police